The following is a timeline of the presidency of Donald Trump during the first quarter of 2018, from January 1 to March 31, 2018. To navigate between quarters, see timeline of the Donald Trump presidency.

Overview

Public opinion

According to FiveThirtyEight, President Trump's approval rate at the end of March was 40.5%, up 2% from the previous quarter and down 4.9% from the start of his presidency. For more polls, see 2018 opinion polling on the Donald Trump administration.

Timeline

January 2018

February 2018

March 2018

See also
Presidential transition of Donald Trump
First 100 days of Donald Trump's presidency
List of executive actions by Donald Trump
List of presidential trips made by Donald Trump (international trips)

References

2018 Q1
Presidency of Donald Trump
January 2018 events in the United States
February 2018 events in the United States
March 2018 events in the United States
2018 timelines
Political timelines of the 2010s by year
Articles containing video clips